Lindapterys sanderi is a species of sea snail, a marine gastropod mollusk in the family Muricidae, the murex snails or rock snails.

Description
Original description: "General morphology as for genus; 6 axial ribs between varices; 5 labial denticles; outer edge of lip very flaring, almost obscuring the underlying varix."

Distribution
Locus typicus: "300 metres depth, off St. James,
West coast of Barbados, Lesser Antilles."

References

Gastropods described in 1987
Lindapterys